Spat may refer to:
 Spat (angular unit), a unit of solid angle
 Spat (distance unit), an obsolete distance unit in astronomy
 Spats (footwear), a type of shoe accessory
 Wheel spats, British term for aerodynamic fairings that reduce the drag on fixed-undercarriage aircraft 
 Spat, the past tense of spit
 Spat (molluscs), settled larvae of shellfish such as oysters and scallops
 Spat, the main villain in the game Hamtaro Ham-Ham Heartbreak
 SPAT, Toamasina Autonomous Port of Madagascar, from French Société de Gestion du Port Autonome de Toamasina
 S.P.A.T., Polish Special Forces, from Polish Samodzielny Pododdział Antyterrorystyczny Komisariatu Policji

See also
 
 
 Spath (disambiguation)
 Spats (disambiguation)
 Spatter (disambiguation)